The foodservice (US English) or catering (British English) industry includes the businesses, institutions, and companies which prepare meals outside the home. It includes restaurants, school and hospital cafeterias, catering operations, and many other formats.

Suppliers to foodservice operators are foodservice distributors, who provide small wares (kitchen utensils) and foods. Some companies manufacture products in both consumer and food service versions. The consumer version usually comes in individual-sized packages with elaborate label design for retail sale. The foodservice version is packaged in a much larger industrial size and often lacks the colorful label designs of the consumer version.

Statistics
The food system, including food service and food retailing supplied $1.24 trillion worth of food in 2010 in the US, $594 billion of which was supplied by food service facilities, defined by the USDA as any place which prepares food for immediate consumption on site, including locations that are not primarily engaged in dispensing meals such as recreational facilities and retail stores. Full-service and fast food restaurants account for 77% of all foodservice sales, with full-service restaurants accounting for just slightly more than fast food in 2010. The shifts in the market shares between fast food and full-service restaurants to market demand changes the offerings of both foods and services of both types of restaurants.

According to the National Restaurant Association a growing trend among US consumers for the foodservice industry is global cuisine with 66% of US consumers eating more widely in 2015 than in 2010, 80% of consumers eating 'ethnic' cuisines at least once a month, and 29% trying a new 'ethnic' cuisine within the last year.

The Foodservice distributor market size is as of 2015 $231 billion in the US; the national broadline market is controlled by US Foods and Sysco which combined have 60-70% share of the market and were blocked from merging by the FTC for reasons of market power.

Health concerns
Foodservice foods tends to be, on average, higher in calories and lower in key nutrients than foods prepared at home. Many restaurants, including fast food, have added more salads and fruit offerings and either by choice or in response to local legislation provided nutrition labeling.

In the US, the FDA is moving towards establishing uniform guidelines for fast food and restaurant labeling, proposed rules were published in 2011 and final regulations published on 1 December 2014 which supersede State and local menu-labeling provisions, going into effect 1 December 2015. Research has shown that the new labels may influence consumer choices, but primarily if it provides unexpected information and that health-conscious consumers are resistant to changing behaviors based on menu labeling  Fast food restaurants are expected by the ERS to do better under the new menu labeling than full-service restaurants as full-service restaurants tend to offer much more calorie-dense foods, with 50% of fast food meals being between 400 and 800 calories and less than 20% above 1000 calories, in contrast, full-service restaurants 20% of meals are above 1,400 calories. When consumers are aware of the calorie counts at full-service restaurants 20% choose lower calorie options and consumers also reduce their calorie intake over the rest of the day.

Eating one meal away from home each week translates to 2 extra pounds each year or a daily increase of 134 calories and a decrease in diet quality by 2 points on the Healthy Eating Index.

Types of service
Counter service is food ordered by the customer at the counter and either picked up at the counter by the customer or delivered to the table by restaurant staff. It is common in fast food restaurants in the United States, and in pubs and bars  in the United Kingdom (see: Table meal).

Table service is food ordered by the customer at the table and served to the customer's table by waiters and waitresses, also known as "servers". Table service is common in most restaurants.  With table service, the customer generally pays at the end of meal. Various methods of table service can be provided, such as silver service.

Food safety

The provision of safe food for foodservice specifies the requirements for the design, implementation, and maintenance of prerequisite programmes (PRPs) to assist in controlling food safety hazards in catering. A technical specification is provided as an international standard, ISO/TS 22002-2:2013 Prerequisite programmes on food safety — Part 2: Catering. This technical specification is part of the ISO 22000 family of standards. The scope includes catering, air catering, railway catering, banquets, among others, in central and satellite units, school and industry dining rooms, hospitals and healthcare facilities, hotels, restaurants, coffee shops, food services, and food stores.

See also

 Horeca
 Food safety

References

External links
What is Foodservice? – Anchor Football Professional

 
Retailers by type of merchandise sold
Serving and dining
Retail formats
Food industry
Industries (economics)